Fabienne Schlumpf (born 17 November 1990) is a Swiss athlete specialising in the 3000 metres steeplechase, and later, marathon running. She won the silver medal at the 2018 European Championships. In 2020, she competed in the women's half marathon at the 2020 World Athletics Half Marathon Championships held in Gdynia, Poland.

Her personal best of 9:37.81 is the current national record.

She used the competition-free time during the Covid-19 pandemic to re-orient towards marathon running. In her first marathon race ever (Belp, April 3rd, 2021) she not only fulfilled the time cutoff to participate at the 2020 Olympics in Tokyo, but with 2:26:14 hours she improved the Swiss record for female marathon runners.

Schlumpf ran her second marathon race at the Olympic Games in Tokyo and was placed 12th with 2:31:36 hours.

International competitions

Personal bests
Outdoor
800 metres – 2:12.80 (Bern 2010)
1500 metres – 4:22.89 (Frauenfeld 2014)
3000 metres – 9:14.89 (Riga 2014)
5000 metres – 15:51.06 (Riga 2014)
3000 metres steeplechase – 9:21.65(Oslo 2017)
10 kilometres – 33:00 (Uster 2015)
15 kilometres – 54:57 (Port Elizabeth 2015)
Half marathon – 1:13:56 (The Hague 2015)
Marathon 2:26:14 (Belp 2021)

Indoor
3000 metres – 9:34.44 (St. Gallen 2016)

References

1990 births
Living people
Swiss steeplechase runners
World Athletics Championships athletes for Switzerland
Athletes (track and field) at the 2016 Summer Olympics
Athletes (track and field) at the 2020 Summer Olympics
Olympic athletes of Switzerland
Female steeplechase runners
Swiss female athletes
21st-century Swiss women
20th-century Swiss women